Isospora sylvianthina  is a species of internal parasites classified under Coccidia.  It frequently occurs in the Eurasian blackcap and the garden warbler.

References

Cited texts
 

Conoidasida
Parasites of birds